Thomas Wyss (born 29 August 1966) is a retired Swiss football midfielder.

He earned 11 caps for the Swiss national team and was in the Swiss squad at the 1994 FIFA World Cup.

He was manager of Zug 94 between July 2003 and June 2005.

Honours

Player
Grasshoppers
 Swiss Championship: 1989–90
 Swiss Cup: 1989–90
 Swiss Super Cup: 1989

References

External links
FIFA.com statistics

1966 births
Living people
Swiss men's footballers
1994 FIFA World Cup players
Switzerland international footballers
Swiss Super League players
FC Aarau players
FC Luzern players
Grasshopper Club Zürich players
FC St. Gallen players
Swiss-German people
Association football midfielders